Arthur Taylor Winfree (May 15, 1942 – November 5, 2002) was a theoretical biologist at the University of Arizona. He was born in St. Petersburg, Florida, United States.

Winfree was noted for his work on the mathematical modeling of biological phenomena (see Complexity and Singularity (system theory)): from cardiac arrhythmia and circadian rhythms to the self-organization of slime mold colonies and the Belousov–Zhabotinsky reaction. Winfree was a MacArthur Fellow from 1984 to 1989, he won the Einthoven Prize  for his work on ventricular fibrillation, and shared the 2000 Norbert Wiener Prize in Applied Mathematics with Alexandre Chorin.

He was the father of Erik Winfree, another MacArthur Fellow and currently a professor at the California Institute of Technology, and Rachael Winfree, currently a professor in the Department of Ecology, Evolution and Natural Resources at Rutgers University.

The Arthur T. Winfree Prize was established by the Society for Mathematical Biology in his honor.

Career

Professorial history
 1965 Bachelor of Engineering Physics, Cornell University
 1970 Ph.D. in biology, Princeton University
 1969–1972 Assistant professor, University of Chicago
 1972–1979 Associate professor of biological sciences, Purdue University
 1979–1986 Professor of biological sciences, Purdue University
 1986–2002 Professor of ecology and evolutionary biology, University of Arizona
 1989–2002 Regents Professor, University of Arizona

Awards and honors

Publications

  (Second edition, first edition published 1980).

References

Cornell University College of Engineering alumni
Princeton University alumni
Theoretical biologists
1942 births
2002 deaths
MacArthur Fellows
Purdue University faculty
University of Chicago faculty
University of Arizona faculty
20th-century American biologists